Sadhana is an Indian actress in Malayalam movies. She was a leading actress during the late 1960s and 1970s in Malayalam and Tamil movies. She has acted in more than 100 movies.

Personal life

She was born in a Muslim family to Babu and Beegam, as eldest of six children, at Guntur, Andhra Pradesh.
Her sister Saleema has also acted in few Tamil movies. She is living in small rented house near Budur, Tamil Nadu with her husband, Ram. They have no children. She's absconded according to sources.

Partial filmography

 Ek Phool Do Mali (1969) as Somna
 Danger Biscuit (1969) as Gracy
 Vilakkappetta Bandhangal (1969)
 Rest House (1969) as Sathi
 Raktha Pushpam (1970)
 Detective 909 Keralathil (1970)
 Kuttavaali (1970) as Shanthi
 Lottery Ticket (1970) as Rajamma
 C.I.D. Nazir (1971) as Lovely
 Lanka Dahanam (1971)
 Rathri Vandi (1971)
 Marunaattil Oru Malayaali (1971) as Rajamma
 Shiksha (1971) as Jayamala
 Ernakulam Junction (1971) as Rathi
 Thettu (1971) as Kukku
 Vivaha Sammanam (1971)
 Pushpaanjali (1972) as Salomi
 Sambhavami Yuge Yuge (1972) as Meena
 Kandavarundo (1972) as Biatriz
 Manthrakodi (1972)
 Maaya (1972).... Ambujam
 Ananthasayanam (1972)
 Naadan Premam (1972)
 Taxi Car (1972) .... Reetha
 Miss Mary (1972)
 Nrithasaala (1972)
 Aaradi Manninte Janmi (1972)
 Theertha Yathra (1972)
 Panimudakku (1972)
 Punarjanmam (1972)
 Panchavadi (1973) as Leela
 Padmavyooham (1973) as Chinnamma
 Ajnaathavasam (1973) as Bindu
 Ladies Hostel (1973) as Reetha
 Thaniniram (1973) as Menaka
 Pachanottukal (1973)
 Yaamini (1973) as Radha
 Urvashi Bharathi (1973)
 Nadeenadanmaare Aavasyamundu (1974)
 Night Duty (1974)
 Sethubandhanam (1974)
 Poonthenaruvi (1974) as Susie
 College Girl (1974) as Leela
 Ayalathe Sundari (1974) as Margosa
 Check Post (1974)
 Bhoogolam Thiriyunnu (1974)
 Swarnnavigraham (1974)
 Pattabhishekam (1974) as Susie
 Suprabhaatham (1974)
 Panchathanthram (1974) as Julie/Vimala Gupta
 Ulsavam (1975) as Kalyani
 Boy Friend (1975)
 Love Marriage (1975) as Kaanchi
 Chandanachola (1975)
 Kalyaanappanthal (1975)
 Yakshagaanam (1976) as Panki
 Rajaankanam (1976)
 Raathriyile Yaathrakkaar (1976)
 Kaadaaru Maasam (1976)
 Pushpasharam (1976)
 Nurayum Pathayum (1977)
 Oonjal (1977) as Kochuparu
 Lakshmi (1977)
 Paavaadakkaari (1978)
 Rowdy Ramu (1978)
 Velluvili (1978) as Sarojini
 Aalmaaraattam (1978)
 Aval Vishwasthayayirunnu (1978) as Nurse
 Kanalkattakal (1978) as Karumbi
 Ithaanente Vazhi (1978)
 Indradhanussu (1979)
 Aval Niraparaadhi (1979)
 Ente Sneham Ninakku Maathram (1979)
 Vellayani Paramu (1979) as Janaki
 Raajaveedhi (1979)
 Maani Koya Kurup (1979)
 Akalangalil Abhayam (1980)
 Theenalangal (1980) as Mariyamma
 Ithikkarappakki (1980)
 Ariyappedaatha Rahasyam (1981) as Reetha
Velicham Vitharunna Penkutty /Punitha Malaar(1982) as Pankajam
Marupacha (1982) as Sadhana
Sandhya Vandanam (film) (1983) as Kalyani
Ithramathram (1986) as Stella

References

External links

 Sadhana at MSI

Actresses in Malayalam cinema
Indian film actresses
People from Guntur district
Actresses from Andhra Pradesh
Year of birth missing (living people)
Living people
Actresses in Tamil cinema
20th-century Indian actresses